La Peña is a Peruvian football club, playing in the city of Lima, Peru.

The club were founded 1968 and play in the Copa Perú which is the third division of the Peruvian league.

History
The club have played at the second level of Peruvian football on seven occasions, from 2003 until 2009.

In the 2009 Peruvian Segunda División, the club was relegated to the Copa Perú.

In the 2010 Copa Perú, the club was eliminated in the Regional Stage, by Cultural Géminis and Juventud Barranco.

Historic Badges

Honours

National
Liga Distrital de Lince: 11
 1992, 1993, 1994, 1995, 1996, 1997, 1998, 1999, 2000, 2001, 2002.

See also
List of football clubs in Peru
Peruvian football league system

Football clubs in Peru
Association football clubs established in 1968